The Banzhang Mountain Tunnel (also known as the Yinbing Road Tunnel) is a tunnel in Zhuhai, China that opened on June 22, 2020 with an official ceremony. Its construction was begun in March 2018, and it has a so-called slow-traffic lane for pedestrians and cyclists. The slow-traffic lane is decorated with paintings on the ceiling depicting clouds in the blue sky. The tunnel is about 1.03 km long and has ventilators to keep the air flowing.

References

Tunnels in China